The Chair of  Mathematics in the University of Glasgow in Scotland was established in 1691.  Previously, under James VI's Nova Erectio, the teaching of Mathematics had been the responsibility of the Regents.

List of Mathematics Professors 
 George Sinclair MA (1691-1696)
 Robert Sinclair MA MD (1699)
 Robert Simson MA MD (1711)
 Rev Prof James Williamson FRSE MA DD (1761)
 James Millar MA (1796)
 James Thomson MA LLD (1832)
 Hugh Blackburn MA (1849)
 William Jack MA LLD (1879)
 George Alexander Gibson MA LLD (1909)
 Thomas Murray MacRobert MA DSc LLD (1927)
 Robert Alexander Rankin MA PhD DSc FRSE (1954-1982)
 Robert Winston Keith Odoni BSc PhD FRSE (1989-2001) 
 Peter Kropholler (2003-2013)
 Michael Wemyss (2016-)

References
Who, What and Where: The History and Constitution of the University of Glasgow.  Compiled by Michael Moss, Moira Rankin and Lesley Richmond)
https://www.universitystory.gla.ac.uk/biography/?id=WH1773&type=P
https://www.maths.gla.ac.uk/~mwemyss/

See also
List of Professorships at the University of Glasgow

Mathematics
Glasgow
1691 establishments in Scotland
Mathematics education in the United Kingdom